The Angel Moroni is an angel whom Joseph Smith reported as having visited him on numerous occasions, beginning on September 21, 1823. According to Smith, the angel was the guardian of the golden plates, buried in the hill Cumorah near Smith's home in western New York; Latter Day Saints believe the plates were the source material for the Book of Mormon. An important figure in the theology of the Latter Day Saint movement, Moroni is featured prominently in Mormon architecture and art. Besides Smith, the Three Witnesses and several other witnesses also reported that they saw Moroni in visions in 1829.

Moroni is thought by Latter Day Saints to be the same person as a Book of Mormon prophet-warrior named Moroni, who was the last to write in the golden plates. The book states that Moroni buried them before he died after a great battle between two pre-Columbian civilizations. After he died, he became an angel who was tasked with directing Smith to their location in the 1820s. According to Smith, he then returned the golden plates to Moroni after they were translated and, as of 1838, Moroni still had the plates in his possession.

Angel's name and identity
There have been two conflicting accounts as to the name of the angel. Initially, Smith merely referred to "an angel" without identifying its name. Thus, in an 1831 letter from Lucy Mack Smith to her brother, she discusses Moroni as the person who buried the plates, but does not identify him as the unnamed "holy angel" that gave Smith the means to translate the golden plates. In Smith's 1832 history, he said he was visited by "an angel of the Lord", who mentioned the Book of Mormon prophet "Moroni" as the last engraver of the golden plates; however, Smith's account did not say whether or not the angel was referring to himself as Moroni.

Smith identified the angel as Moroni in 1835, while preparing the first edition of the Doctrine and Covenants, in which he indicated a number of angels who would come to the earth after the Second Coming and drink sacramental wine with himself and Oliver Cowdery. Among those angels, the revelation listed "Moroni, whom I have sent unto you to reveal the book of Mormon, containing the fulness of my everlasting gospel; to whom I have committed the keys of the record of the stick of Ephraim". Around this time, Cowdery was writing a history of Smith in which he identified the angel as the prophet Moroni from the Book of Mormon. In July 1838, Smith wrote an article for the church periodical Elders' Journal, in the form of questions and answers, that stated the following:
Question 4th. How, and where did you obtain the book of Mormon?<p>Answer. Moroni, the person who deposited the plates, from whence the book of Mormon was translated, in a hill in Manchester, Ontario County, New York, as a resurrected being, appeared unto me, and told me where they were; and gave me directions how to obtain them.

However, on May 2, 1838, a few months before Smith's statement in Elders' Journal, Smith began dictating a church history that included a detailed account of his visits from the angel. In this text, Smith identified the angel as "Nephi", which is the name of the Book of Mormon's first narrator. Smith's 1838 identification as "Nephi" was left unchanged when the 1838 history was published in 1842 in Times and Seasons, which Smith edited himself, and in Millennial Star. In the latter, an editorial referred to the 1823 vision and praised "the glorious ministry and message of the angel Nephi". In 1851, after Smith's death (1844), the identification as "Nephi" was repeated when the Church of Jesus Christ of Latter-day Saints (LDS Church) published its first edition of the Pearl of Great Price. It was also repeated in 1853 when Smith's mother Lucy Mack Smith published a history of her son.

As a further complication, Mary Whitmer, mother to one of the Three Witnesses and four of the Eight Witnesses, said she had a vision of the golden plates, shown to her by an angel whom she always called "Brother Nephi", who may or may not have been the same angel to which Smith referred.

Nevertheless, based on Smith's other statements that the angel was "Moroni," and based on both prior and later publications, most Latter Day Saints view Smith's 1838 identification of the angel as Nephi as a mistake, perhaps on the part of the transcriber or a later editor. In the version of Smith's 1838 history published by the LDS Church, as well as the portion canonized by that denomination as the Pearl of Great Price, the name "Nephi" has been changed by editors to read "Moroni". The Community of Christ publishes the original story, including the identification of "Nephi", but indicates "Moroni" in a footnote.

Description
In one of Smith's histories, he described him as an "angel of light" who "had on a loose robe of most exquisite whiteness. It was a whiteness beyond anything earthly I had ever seen .… His hands were naked and his arms also a little above the wrists .… Not only was his robe exceedingly white but his whole person was glorious beyond description". According to Smith's sister Katharine, the angel "was dressed in white raiment, of whiteness beyond anything Joseph had ever seen in his life, and had a girdle about his waist. He saw his hands and wrists, and they were pure and white".

Appearances to Joseph Smith and others

Smith said that on the night of September 21, 1823, Moroni appeared to him and told him about the golden plates that were buried in a stone box a few miles from Smith's home. Smith said that the same angel visited him various times over the course of the next six years; Smith also said that the angel visited him to retrieve the golden plates after Smith had finished translating a portion of the writing on the plates into the Book of Mormon.

In addition to Smith, several other early Mormons said they had visions where they saw the angel Moroni. Three Witnesses said they saw the angel in 1829: Oliver Cowdery, David Whitmer, and Martin Harris. Other early Mormons who said they saw Moroni include:
Emma Hale Smith
Hyrum Smith
Luke S. Johnson
Zera Pulsipher, W. W. Phelps; later disputed.
John P. Greene and his wife Rhoda
John Taylor
Oliver Granger
Heber C. Kimball
Lucy Harris
Harrison Burgess

Mary Whitmer may also have seen Moroni, although she referred to the angel she saw as "Brother Nephi".

Mortal life of Moroni the prophet

According to the Book of Mormon, Moroni was the son of Mormon, the prophet for whom the Book of Mormon is named. Moroni may have been named after Captain Moroni, an earlier Book of Mormon figure. Before Mormon's death in battle, he passed the golden plates to Moroni. Moroni then finished writing on the plates and concluded the record, presumably burying them in the hill Cumorah in western New York. He is the namesake of the Book of Moroni in the Book of Mormon.

Theological significance

The image of the angel Moroni blowing a trumpet is commonly used as an unofficial symbol of the LDS Church. Moroni appears on the cover of some editions of the Book of Mormon. Statues of the angel stand atop many LDS temples, with most statues facing east.

In 2007, the LDS Church stated that an image of the angel Moroni in an advertisement violated one of the church's registered trademarks.

Theorized origin of the name

Commenting on the name of the angel Moroni, Grant H. Palmer speculates that Smith had read of the city Moroni on the island Comoros from either a map or tales of Captain William Kidd, popular at the time.

Mormon scholar Hugh Nibley noted the prevalence of names in the Book of Mormon with the root "mor" and suggested that the root may be of Egyptian origin with the meaning of "beloved".

Sculptors
The Nauvoo Temple was the first Latter Day Saint temple to be crowned with a figure of an angel. This angel, not officially identified as Moroni, was a metal weathervane with gold leaf on the trumpet. It was designed by William Weeks (architect of the Nauvoo temple) and installed in January 1846. This figure was positioned in a flying horizontal position holding an open book in one hand and a trumpet in the other.

Cyrus Dallin sculpted the first angel which was identified as Moroni. This angel was placed on the Salt Lake Temple during the capstone ceremony on April 6, 1892, one year to the day before the temple was dedicated. Dallin's design is a dignified, neoclassical angel in robe and cap, standing upright with a trumpet in hand. It stands 3.8 meters high, was molded in hammered copper from the plaster original, and was covered with 22-karat gold leaf. On March 18, 2020, the trumpet held by the statue of Angel Moroni on the Salt Lake Temple fell to the ground as a result of a 5.7 magnitude earthquake. 

Torleif S. Knaphus fashioned a replica of the Dallin angel in the 1930s, but the casting of his angel wasn't placed on a temple until many years later. In 1983, castings of this angel were placed on the Idaho Falls Temple (8th operating temple) and the Atlanta Temple (21st operating temple).

Millard F. Malin's angel, which was placed on the Los Angeles Temple in 1953, is known as the second Angel Moroni statue. His angel was cast in aluminum, stands 4.7 meters high, and weighs 953 kilograms. It has Native American features, wears a Mayan style cloak, and holds the gold plates in its left hand.

Avard Fairbanks sculpted the third Angel Moroni statue, which was placed on the Washington D.C. Temple, dedicated in 1974. This angel was created as a one-meter model which was sent to Italy where it was enlarged, cast in bronze, and gilded. The Seattle Washington, Jordan River Utah, and México City México temples each have a 4.6 meter casting of this statue.

Karl Quilter sculpted his first Angel Moroni in 1978. Two sizes were made, one three meters high, the other just over two meters. These statues were designed to reduce the cost and weight of the previous Angel Moroni statues, in order to become a standard part of the temple architecture. The Quilter angels are made of fiberglass and covered with gold leaf. In 1998, with the construction of many new smaller temples, Quilter was commissioned to create a new angel. This angel was similar in design to his previous angels, but he gave Moroni a slightly larger build, with his left hand opened and his body turned slightly to show more action. The Bern Switzerland Temple's Angel Moroni is patterned after Quilter's 1998 design. Quilter's Angel Moroni is now on over one hundred temples around the world.

See also
 List of angels in theology

Notes

References

.
.
.
.
.
.
.
.
.
.
.
 .
.

Further reading

References to Moroni2, Index, Book of Mormon (LDS edition)

External links

 
1823 in Christianity
1827 in Christianity
Angelic apparitions
Angels in Christianity
Book of Mormon prophets
Christian symbols
Doctrine and Covenants people
Individual angels
Works by Cyrus Edwin Dallin